Noctua interjecta, the least yellow underwing, is a species of moth of the family Noctuidae. It is found in Europe.

Subspecies
There are two subspecies:
 Noctua interjecta interjecta (Alps, southern France, northern and south-eastern Spain, northern Portugal, Italy, Bulgaria, northern Greece and Romania)
 Noctua interjecta caliginosa (Schawerda, 1919) (southern and central England, Wales, southern Ireland, northern France, Belgium, Luxemburg, Netherlands, northern Germany, Denmark, southern Sweden, Czech Republic and Austria)

Description

The wingspan is 31–36 mm. The length of the forewings is 14–17 mm. Forewing greyish rufous, sometimes darkened with fuscous; lines and stigmata a little darker, often very obscure; hindwing orange yellow with a broad marginal black border; costal and inner margins, a submedian streak from base, and the cell blackish; fringe yellow.

The larva is pale ochreous with black dots; the lines pale, with darker edges.

Biology

In Belgium and the Netherlands, this species flies in one generation from late June to August.

The larvae feed on various grasses and herbaceous plants such as meadowsweet (Filipendula ulmaria) and common mallow (Malva sylvestris).

References

External links

Lepiforum
Noctua interjecta, at Markku Savela's Lepidoptera and Some Other Life Forms
Fauna Europaea
Noctua interjecta (Hübner, 1803), Lepidoptera of Belgium
Least yellow underwing, at UKMoths

Noctua (moth)
Moths of Europe
Moths of the Middle East
Moths described in 1803
Taxa named by Jacob Hübner